Eta Coronae Borealis (η Coronae Borealis, η CrB) is a stellar system that lies approximately 58 light-years away. The primary component is a mid-wide binary, while a brown dwarf component is located at a wide separation.

Components
Eta Coronae Borealis has been known since the late 18th century to be a moderate-separation binary. The orbit of the two components takes approximately 42 years, which when combined with the distance to the system makes the two stars fairly easily resolvable with a larger telescope. The two stars have similar physical parameters, though the secondary is slightly cooler than the primary and has approximately 90% of the primary's mass.  Possible stable planetary orbits in the habitable zone were calculated for the system in 1996.

At present the angular separation between both stars is 0.5 arcseconds, so a telescope with a diameter of over 25 centimetres is required to resolve it .

A brown dwarf companion was detected in 2001. The source 2MASSW J1523226+301456 in the 2MASS working database was identified as having a similar proper motion to the AB binary, and subsequent observations confirmed its relationship to the system. The new component, Eta Coronae Borealis C, was found to have a spectral type of L8.

See also
 81 Cancri

References

Corona Borealis
G-type main-sequence stars
Coronae Borealis, Eta
Coronae Borealis, 02
075312
Brown dwarfs
5727
0584
137107 8
Triple star systems
Durchmusterung objects